(born August 27, 1989), known mononymously as Sho (stylized as SHO),  is a Japanese professional wrestler. He is currently signed to New Japan Pro-Wrestling (NJPW), where he is a member of Bullet Club, and its sub-group House of Torture.

He is a former member of Chaos and was a part of the tag team Roppongi 3K along with Yoh; the two are five-time IWGP Junior Heavyweight Tag Team Champions. He has previously worked for the American promotion Ring of Honor (ROH) and Mexican promotion Consejo Mundial de Lucha Libre (CMLL), where he was known under the ring name , named after the Japanese God of thunder, and was part of La Ola Amarilla ("the Yellow Wave") alongside Okumura, Kamaitachi and Fujin.

Early life 
Sho Tanaka was born on August 27, 1989, in Uwajima, Ehime, Japan. While in high school he became involved with Greco-Roman wrestling, something he continued to practice as he attended Tokuyama University. At Tokuyama he was the vice-captain of the wrestling team, competing in the 7th All-Japan University Championship for Greco-Roman wrestling, where he came in third over all.

Professional wrestling career 
Inspired by New Japan Pro-Wrestling (NJPW) wrestler Hiroshi Tanahashi Tanaka attended the NJPW Dojo in February, 2012 training for his professional wrestling career.

New Japan Pro-Wrestling (2012–2016) 

On November 11, 2012 Tanaka made his pro wrestling debut in the opening match of the NEVER: Shodai NEVER Musabetsu Kyu Oza Kettei Tournament 1st round show where he lost to Takaaki Watanabe. Tanaka competed as one of NJPW's "Young Lions" a class of rookie wrestlers who work mostly against each other early on, wearing all black gear and with no particular ring character, all part of the structured learning process in NJPW. Throughout 2013 and 2014 Tanaka often faced off against fellow Young Lion Yohei Komatsu, with both men trading victories in both singles and tag team competition. By 2015 Tanaka and Komatsu had begun teaming together on a regular basis, including working together in the New Japan Rumble as part of Wrestle Kingdom 9 on January 5, 2015. The two teamed up to eliminate Tiger Mask and Taichi but were both eliminated by Tama Tonga Tanaka was called upon to replace an injured Rey Cometa on a NJPW/Consejo Mundial de Lucha Libre co-promoted Fantastica Mania 2015 show on January 14. Tanaka and Stigma lost to La Peste Negra ("The Black Plague"; Bárbaro Cavernario and Mr. Niebla) On February 11, 2015 Tanaka defeated rival and occasional tag team partner Yohei Komatsu in the opening match of NJPW's 2015 The New Beginning in Osaka show. In June and July 2015 Tanaka represented NJPW in Pro Wrestling Noah's Global Junior Heavyweight League. During the tournament he earned two points by defeating Hitoshi Kumano but lost to Daisuke Harada, Zack Sabre Jr. El Desperado, Kenoh and Yoshinari Ogawa to be eliminated from the tournament. At the 2015 Destruction in Kobe show Tanaka and Komatsu defeated fellow Young Lions David Finlay and Jay White.

In early 2016 it was announced that Tanaka and Komatsu would compete in the 2016 Fantastica Mania series of shows, competing in what NJPW called the "Yohei Komatsu and Sho Tanaka send-off game", announcing that the two would travel to Mexico and work for CMLL as part of their continued in-ring skill development. The team worked the opening match for each of the six Fantastica Mania events, losing each time.

Overseas learning excursion (2016–2017) 
Tanaka and Komatsu became be the latest in a long line of young Japanese wrestlers to travel to Mexico to learn the lucha libre style. In Mexico, Tanaka was given the ring name Raijin, named after the Japanese God of Thunder, teaming with Komatsu who would be known as Fujin, named after the Japanese God of Wind. The duo made their Mexican debut on January 31, 2016, teaming up with Okumura, forming the most recent version of La Ola Amarilla ("The Yellow Wave"). The group was joined by Kamaitachi, a previous NJPW trainee who has worked for CMLL since 2014.

In October 2016, Tanaka and Komatsu, now billed as "Sho" and "Yohey", The Tempura Boyz, began working regularly for American promotion Ring of Honor (ROH), with whom NJPW also had a working relationship.

Return to NJPW (2017–present)

Chaos (2017–2021) 

On October 9, 2017, at King of Pro-Wrestling, Tanaka and Komatsu, billed as "Sho" and "Yoh", returned to NJPW, when they were revealed as Rocky Romero's new tag team Roppongi 3K. The two defeated Funky Future (Ricochet and Ryusuke Taguchi) in their return match to become the new IWGP Junior Heavyweight Tag Team Champions. Through their affiliation with Romero, Sho and Yoh also became part of the Chaos stable. On November 5 at Power Struggle, Roppongi 3K defeated Super 69 (A. C. H. and Ryusuke Taguchi) in the finals to win the 2017 Super Jr. Tag Tournament. On January 4, 2018, Roppongi 3K lost the IWGP Junior Heavyweight Tag Team Championship to The Young Bucks (Matt Jackson and Nick Jackson) at Wrestle Kingdom 12 in Tokyo Dome, but won it back on January 28 at the New Beginning in Sapporo. Roppongi 3K lost the tag team championships to El Desperado and Yoshinobu Kanemaru at the NJPW 46th Anniversary Event in March 2018. In May 2018, he entered the Best of the Super Juniors tournament. He finished the tournament with 3 wins and 4 losses, failing to advance to the finals. In October, Sho and Yoh entered the 2018 Super Junior Tag League, winning the tournament for the second time in a row to face El Desperado and Yoshinobu Kanemaru at Wrestle Kingdom 13. However, an earlier loss to the team of Shingo Takagi and Bushi made the title match a triple threat, that Takagi and Bushi would go onto win, with Takagi pinning Sho. At New Japan’s 47th Anniversary Event, Sho and Yoh would defeat Takagi and Bushi to win the championships for a third time. Sho would then start to call out Takagi for a singles match, even hoping to face Takagi in the Best of the Super Juniors 26 finals. Takagi and Sho would meet on the first night of the tournament with Takagi defeating Sho. In June, Roppongi 3K would lose the Junior Tag Team Championships to the team of El Phantasmo and Taiji Ishimori. In November, Sho and Yoh would win the Super Junior Tag League for the 3rd time in a row. At Wrestle Kingdom 14, Roppongi 3K would defeat Phantasmo and Ishimori to win the titles for a fourth time. Roppongi 3K would make their first successful title defense against Desperado and Kanemaru at The New Beginning in Osaka. They would make their second successful title defense against Rocky Romero and Ryusuke Taguchi on the first night of the New Japan Road tour. Following New Japan’s return to producing wrestling shows, Sho entered the 2020 New Japan Cup avenging his loss to Shingo Takagi in the first round before losing to Sanada in the second. Sho challenged for his first singles title, the NEVER Openweight Championship, in a defeat to Takagi at Dominion. Unfortunately during that time, Roppongi 3K was forced to relinquish the IWGP Junior Heavyweight Tag Championships due to Yoh suffering a knee injury against Bushi during the New Japan Cup. In November 2020, he entered the Best of the Super Juniors tournament. He finished the tournament with 6 wins and 3 losses, failing to advance to the finals.

In 2021, Sho challenged for the IWGP Junior Heavyweight Championship for the first time in his career, but failed to capture the title from Hiromu Takahashi in the main event of The New Beginning. Yoh made his return from injury at Sakura Genesis, reuniting Roppongi 3K. The team would then capture the IWGP Junior Heavyweight Tag Team Championship for the fifth time, defeating El Desperado and Yoshinobu Kanemaru. On June 23 at Kizuna Road, 3K would lose their titles to El Phantasmo and Ishimori. 

In the following months 3K would hit a major slump after losing their championship with both members having no clear direction or feuds, and with the team taking numerous losses in multi man tag matches. In late July, Yoh, who had also started sporting a more toned down look and demeanor, began to undergo a large losing streak, taking the pins in three straight matches prior to Super Jr. Tag League beginning, which left Sho seemingly worried for him and the team's future. Roppongi 3K entered the tournament, but lost their first three straight matches, immediately being eliminated from the tournament they had never failed to win in any year prior, with Yoh once again taking the falls each time out. On August 16, Roppongi 3K would lose their fourth tournament match to El Desperado and Kanemaru, after Sho chose to not help Yoh escape a submission hold from Desperado. After the match Sho would attack Yoh and claim that he was now useless to him, disbanding their team after nine years, and turning heel for the first time in his New Japan career.

Bullet Club (2021–present) 
On September 4, 2021 he defeated his former tag team partner Yoh by referee stoppage at night 1 of Wrestle Grand Slam in MetLife Dome. After the match, Sho joined Bullet Club, by accepting the shirt given to him by Evil. Alongside Evil, Yujiro Takahashi and Dick Togo, he is a part of the sub-group House of Torture, where Takahashi, Evil, and Sho are the Never Openweight Six Man Tag Team Champions in their first reign.

Mixed martial arts career 
Tanaka was scheduled to make his mixed martial arts debut on May 27, 2017, fighting Nicholas Trochez in Queens, New York for Golden MMA Championships. Trochez first failed to make weight for the fight, which Tanaka was reportedly willing to overlook, but the fight ended up being canceled when Trochez's medical information also did not come in on time.

Championships and accomplishments 

 New Japan Pro-Wrestling
 IWGP Junior Heavyweight Tag Team Championship (5 times) – with Yoh
NEVER Openweight 6-Man Tag Team Championship (2 times, current) - with Evil and Yujiro Takahashi
 Super Jr. Tag Tournament (2017, 2018, 2019) – with Yoh
Concurso (2019)
 Pro Wrestling Illustrated
 Ranked No. 163 of the top 500 singles wrestlers in the PWI 500 in 2018
 Ranked No. 10 of the top 50 tag teams in the PWI Tag Team 50 in 2020

References

External links 

 
 
 

1989 births
Tokuyama University alumni
Japanese male professional wrestlers
Living people
People from Uwajima, Ehime
Chaos (professional wrestling) members
Sasuke (TV series) contestants
IWGP Junior Heavyweight Tag Team Champions
NEVER Openweight 6-Man Tag Team Champions
Bullet Club members